The seventh competition weekend of the 2014–15 ISU Speed Skating World Cup will be held in the Gunda Niemann-Stirnemann-Halle in Erfurt, Germany, from Saturday, 21 March, until Sunday, 22 March 2015.

Schedule
The detailed schedule of events:

All times are CET (UTC+1).

Medal summary

Men's events

 In mass start, race points are accumulated during the race. The skater with most race points is the winner.

Women's events

 In mass start, race points are accumulated during the race. The skater with most race points is the winner.

References

 
7
Isu World Cup, 2014-15, 7
Sport in Erfurt
2010s in Thuringia